The Convento de las Dueñas is a Dominican convent located in the city of Salamanca. It was built in the 15th and 16th centuries.

History
The convent was founded in 1419 by Juana Rodriguez Maldonado in her own palace.
The church and the cloister were built around 1533.

Architecture
The convent preserves some of the original mudejar gates of the palace. One of them leads to the cloister. The capitals of the upper storey are among the more prominent examples of the Plateresque.

Sources

Roman Catholic churches in Salamanca
Renaissance architecture in Spain